Michael Mark Welner, M.D., (born September 24, 1964) is an American forensic psychiatrist  and Chairman of The Forensic Panel. Welner is best known for his work in sensitive and complex litigation. He has acted as lead forensic psychiatric examiner in numerous criminal or court proceedings of national and international prominence, including precedent-setting trials and higher court decisions. Welner is also known for a number of innovations in forensic science, forensic psychiatry and justice, including protocols for prospective peer review in forensic medicine consultation, research to standardize an evidence-based distinction of the worst crimes,  The Depravity Standard, and recommendations for upgrading forensic science assessment. He has been featured in network television news coverage of forensic psychiatry issues, has authored publications for professional and public audiences, and has contributed to emerging legislation on mental health reform.

Notable cases 

Welner is best known for his role and impact in a range of legal cases within the criminal and civil courts. Those of particular prominence or legal significance include:

State of New York vs. Pedro Hernandez – Etan Patz disappearance and murder 
Nearly 40 years after Etan Patz disappeared, Pedro Hernandez was arrested in connection with his kidnapping and murder. Prior to Hernandez' arrest and a relative's revelations about his confessions, many authorities believed that Jose Ramos, convicted of other sex crimes, was responsible for Etan Patz' disappearance.

Prosecutors first involved Welner at the early stages after the arrest, before filing charges, to consider defense claims from several psychologists that Hernandez was mentally ill and intellectually disabled and falsely confessed. The defense presented multiple expert opinions in support of their claims that Hernandez was and that his confessions were unreliable. Welner interviewed Hernandez for sixteen hours, interviewed police, studied confessions he had made many years earlier to a prayer group and to a fiancée, as well as to an acquaintance, and the more recent confessions he made to police interrogators in 2012, medical staff, as well as Welner himself. Welner concluded that Hernandez confessed because he felt intense guilt and that the spontaneous, voluntary confessions Hernandez made decades earlier to a prayer group and his fiancée couldn't be attributed to a psychiatric condition.

The case proceeded to trial in 2015. Eleven jurors voted guilty, with one holdout juror remaining after nearly three weeks of deliberation. Dr. Welner testified for prosecutors at the original trial and then at the retrial, in which a jury unanimously rendered a guilty verdict to Hernandez in early 2017. Among other points, Welner told jurors it was possible Hernandez tried to minimize the damage he'd done even though he confessed. "It is not remarkable at all for a person to recall a sequence of events and to portray it in a way that is as unremarkable as possible, scrubbing away details … (creating a) much more detached relationship between that person and a victim."

U.S. vs. Brian David Mitchell – Elizabeth Smart kidnappers – Sect Psychology and Brainwashing 

Brian David Mitchell, a self-proclaimed prophet, was charged along with his wife in connection with the 2002 kidnapping of Elizabeth Smart. In a case involving the complexities of determining religious zeal from psychosis, Mitchell had been found not competent to stand trial in 2005. Mitchell then began a consistent pattern of singing hymns in court and silence to forensic examiners.

Subsequent evaluations in a state hospital, with which Mitchell did not cooperate, deemed Mitchell to be unchanged – and therefore incompetent. Three years passed, and the case was contemplated for dismissal in state court  when federal prosecutors asked Dr. Welner to study the matter to a definitive end. He filed a 206-page report detailing extensive new information uncovered in his evaluation, and testified to his conclusions that Mitchell was competent. At a 2010 hearing, Justice Dale Kimball ruled Mitchell was competent to proceed.

The case proceeded to trial, where Dr. Welner testified that Mitchell was a pedophile, a sadist, personality disordered, and not legally insane.  His testimony drew particular attention to cognitive distortions as they differ from delusions, and culture-specific beliefs of fundamentalist LDS adherents. Mitchell was convicted and sentenced to life in prison. The defense waived its right to appeal.

Dr. Welner was also the principal mental health consultant to prosecutors of the NXIVM sect leader Keith Raniere. His work on the grooming of victims has been cited in victimology references and in sentencing of formerly molested offenders such as Daniel Kovarbisch.

State vs. Byran Uyesugi - Mass murder 

Byran Uyesugi, a forty-year-old Xerox service technician, killed seven of his co-workers on November 2, 1999, in the worst mass murder case in the history of Hawaii. Uyesugi began working for Xerox in 1984. He began making unfounded accusations of harassment and product tampering against fellow repairmen, who had great difficulty placating his anger. Coworkers told Welner, who interviewed family, friends, neighbors, co-workers, and Uyesugi prior to trial, that as early as 1995, Uyesugi was openly speaking of carrying out a mass shooting at the workplace were he ever to be fired.

In the period leading up to the shooting, Xerox management increasingly committed to phasing out the copier that Uyesugi had been servicing. He resisted learning the new machine, fearing that he could not keep up with its technical demands. After working around his refusal to train on the new machine, Uyesugi's manager insisted on November 1, 1999, that he would begin training the next day.  Instead, Uyesugi came to work the next day and shot his colleagues dead, narrowly missing an eighth victim, after calmly waiting by the water fountain, with "butterflies in his stomach," he later told Welner, as he contemplated the shooting before going through with it.

Uyesugi pleaded not guilty by reason of insanity and claimed that he feared his colleagues were conspiring to have him fired. Welner testified for the prosecution that although Mr. Uyesugi was in his opinion a schizophrenic, "He knew what he was doing was wrong, and he simply did not care.  The jury found him sane and guilty of seven murders and one attempted murder after only 75 minutes of deliberation.   He received a sentence of life without chance of parole.  In 2002, the State of Hawaii Supreme Court upheld Uyesugi's conviction.

Dr. Welner has consulted to courts or examined perpetrators on numerous mass shooting and attempted mass shooting cases, including Colorado's James Holmes, NBC gunman William Tager, corrections officer George Banks, who killed 13, Tavares Calloway, and bias-hatred mass shooters Richard Baumhammers, Ronald Taylor, and Ronald Crumpley.

State of Alabama vs. Harvey Updyke – Sports and culture 

Harvey Updyke, a fanatic of Alabama Crimson Tide football, was charged with poisoning the iconic trees at Auburn University's Toomer's Corner in 2011. Updyke's actions, which inspired an ESPN 30 for 30 documentary film, became a symbol of the intensity of the Alabama-Auburn football rivalry. At the same time, Updyke continued to exhibit bizarre behavior after his original arrest.

The case reflected on the forensic psychiatric significance of fans' response to emotional defeats, as evidenced by the Auburn defeat of Alabama in November 2010, and the social culture of spectator sports message boards. Prosecutors consulted Welner to review the Updyke history and appraise the boundaries of sports fanaticism vs. mental illness, assess his mental state and criminal responsibility. Updyke pleaded guilty prior to trial.

Welner also engaged mental health issues unique to the culture of professional sports as the forensic psychiatry examiner in the manslaughter trial of former NBA star Jayson Williams, and the death investigation of wrestling champion Chris Benoit.

State of Texas vs. Andrea Yates - Insanity and child killing 
Andrea Yates was prosecuted by the State of Texas for the murder of her five children. She claimed legal insanity as a defense at trial for the murder of three of her children. In 2002, Yates was convicted of murder, and sentenced her to life imprisonment. In 2005, the conviction was overturned because the prosecution witness, Park Dietz, falsely testified that Yates' behavior and defense was identical to an earlier episode of Law & Order. There was no such episode. In anticipation of the 2006 retrial for the drowning of her five children, prosecutors asked Welner to assess her diagnosis and Yates' appreciation of the wrong of killing her children at the time of the crime, the criteria for legal insanity. In the videotaped interview with Welner, Yates admitted that she had actually determined to kill the children two months earlier and at a time of relative stability, and was waiting for her first occasion to be alone with them. She knew she would otherwise be stopped. Welner diagnosed Yates with psychotic depression, but concluded that she elected to kill her children because she was overwhelmed, timed with the departure of her mother-in-law that left her as sole caregiver of her five children. Welner also discovered that Andrea Yates locked up the family dog, which was usually free to run around in the house, before drowning the children. Welner included this as one of 68 examples of Yates' appreciation of the wrong of killing her children at the time it happened.

With Welner's examination still ongoing, prosecutors called Deitz at the second trial to testify once again that Yates appreciated that her actions were wrong; Dietz also testified that Yates was not grossly psychotic. Welner later testified that while Yates was psychotic, she appreciated the wrong of her actions. The presiding judge neither allowed the jury access to Welner's 124-page report, nor allowed him to testify to the contents of his interviews of 23 witnesses, including Ms. Yates' husband. Prosecutors did not show Welner's 14-hour interview to the jury, nor introduce psychological testing evidence showing her lack of remorse. The jury, which had been culled from a group that was already familiar with heavy news reporting in the earlier trial and without individual voir dire for their feelings about the case, found Yates not guilty by reason of insanity.

In the aftermath, Yates jurors who later acknowledged personal experiences with mental illness championed the verdict as a landmark. Foreman Todd Frank offered the verdict also conveyed a message to society. "Don't let this happen again. Do what you've got to do with the legislation, with insurance companies," Frank said." Welner has in turn cautioned that overwhelmed, ill or drug addicted mothers who previously contemplate the killing their children as unthinkable would look to Andrea Yates' being sent to a hospital and consider child homicide as an option, adding of filicide, "nobody speaks for the children."

Dr. Welner has been the principal examiner in a number of other notable insanity defense cases  and others involving child killing within the family, including John Alan Rubio.

State of Louisiana vs. Damon Thibodeaux - Disputed confessions 
Damon Thibodeaux confessed in 1996 to raping and murdering a cousin, Crystal Champagne. He was tried, convicted, and sentenced to death. Although appeals upheld the verdict, defense attorneys raised numerous points to the Jefferson Parish District Attorney to argue that Thibodeaux was innocent. No DNA evidence was dispositive and no other perpetrator had been identified beyond speculation. Given the importance of Thibodeaux' confession to the evidence against Thibodeaux, District Attorney Paul Connick asked Welner to review the available evidence, the circumstances of the interrogation and the setting in which it occurred, as well as Thibodeaux' vulnerabilities, to inform their decision-making about the case. Dr. Welner also conducted a videotaped interview of Thibodeaux, in a case that featured considerable cooperation by prosecution and defense with his protocol.
Welner concluded the confession was false because physical findings grossly contradicted Thibodeaux' statements. He issued a 53-page opinion addressing the causes and factors leading to the false confession. These included the defendant's profound guilt over the fate of his cousin, being confronted with his failed polygraph, and police convincing him that what Thibodeaux himself conceded were false statements in the interrogation clinched his guilt and made continuing denials hopeless. Informed of Dr. Welner's conclusions, the District Attorney moved to vacate the confession and Thibodeaux was released. The murder of Crystal Champagne remains under investigation.

Welner has examined numerous other notable and cited disputed confession cases in North American courts, including the killer of New York Socialite Linda Stein and the Albuquerque murder investigation of Victoria Martens.

State of Kansas vs. Cheever - Death penalty 

Scott Cheever was arrested for the shooting death of Sheriff Matthew Samuels at a rural methamphetamine lab. When defense attorneys raised the prospect of a psychiatric defense, federal prosecutors retained Welner to examine criminal responsibility claims, ranging from psychiatric diagnoses to the effects of methamphetamine.  Welner's review of the case included a videotaped interview of the defendant, in which they discussed the events of the crime, his movements before and during the shooting of Samuels, and what was influencing his decisions.

Defense attorneys at trial instead offered a defense of methamphetamine intoxication. Welner, whose own inquiry had studied what Cheever took, when he took it, and amphetamine's effects on his behavior, and testified in rebuttal that Cheever was making decisions and controlling his actions from moment to moment before the crime, despite having used methamphetamine a short time earlier. Cheever was convicted and eventually sentenced to death.

The Kansas Supreme Court reversed the verdict, and ruled that the trial court erred in permitting prosecutors to call Welner as a witness because an intoxication defense was not a mental health defense. In the court's opinion, the error required a new trial because Welner's testimony included a detailed accounting of Cheever's actions in his own words, and was, "extensive and devastating." In a rare outcome, The United States Supreme Court then unanimously reversed the Kansas Supreme Court, ruling that an intoxication defense, when raised by a defendant, waived a Fifth Amendment protection, that prosecutors had a right to call Welner in rebuttal, and reinstated the verdict and death sentence.

In addition to Cheever, Dr. Welner has examined defendants and/or testified in numerous other notable or court cited death penalty cases, including Alfonso Rodriguez  and the Angola 5, and cases involving methamphetamine  and other drugs and medicines that affect behavior.

U.S. vs. Omar Khadr - Terrorism and War 

Khadr, a fifteen-year-old Canadian expatriate living in Afghanistan, was charged with the killing of U.S. Army medic Christopher Speer at an al-Qaeda safe house in Khost. Khadr was captured by American forces on July 27, 2002, and held first in Bagram, Afghanistan and then at Guantanamo Bay detention camp. He was prosecuted through a U.S. military tribunal.

The Department of Defense engaged Welner to examine claims by Khadr that his confessions were coerced, or alternatively, that he was too immature to withstand interrogation. Welner was also asked to assess issues of criminal responsibility. Welner reviewed the available interrogations and secured access to intelligence sources and Khadr's classified file. He interviewed guards, interrogators, medical personnel, Guantanamo camp commanders, intelligence data analysts, and then, Khadr himself.  Welner concluded Khadr's confessions were the product of his being confronted with later-recovered video of his assembling bombs, and video of his asserting that he wanted to kill many Americans. Welner's inquiry also led him to repudiate defense claims that Khadr had been tortured. He came to the impression of Khadr as worldly beyond his years, from the range of his travel and interactions to experiences with other languages and translating al-Qaeda meetings for his father, to evasion techniques he manifested in interrogations with senior intelligence personnel. After a lengthy proceeding, Judge Patrick Parrish admitted Omar Khadr's confessions into evidence, ruling, "there isn't credible evidence the accused was ever tortured…even using a liberal interpretation considering the accused's age."

Military prosecutors also asked Welner to assess Mr. Khadr's likelihood of recidivism into radical jihadism upon release, for presentation at a sentencing hearing. Welner based his assessment on clinical data, research on deradicalization programs, research on incarcerated Muslim youth, and statistics of recidivism of Guantanamo detainees. At the sentencing proceeding, Welner testified that Mr. Khadr was a high risk of recidivism into dangerous jihadist activities, although he did not expect him to be directly violent. Factors contributing to Welner's opinion included Khadr's continued strong enmeshment with his jihadist family and its legacy, the international and financial infrastructure available to him, his stature among other detainees, among other factors. Referencing Mr. Khadr's evolution at Guantanamo, Welner's testimony noted that then 24-year-old Khadr had been "marinating in jihad," and how the deputy camp commander characterized him as a "rock star" to other inmates who engaged him to lead them. The jury sentenced Khadr to 40 years in prison, though preempted by a pre-existing plea bargain, he was to serve no more than eight additional years at either Guantanamo Bay or in a Canadian prison. A defense appeal directed at Welner's testimony was summarily dismissed.

In March 2011, Canadian Public Safety Minister Vic Toews wrote to U.S. Defense Secretary Leon Panetta, asserting that Canada would need to review the sealed tape of Welner's interview in order to consider repatriating Khadr. After reviewing the interviews, Canada repatriated Khadr on September 29, 2012, under heavy pressure from the United States government. However, Canada echoed Welner's previously stated concerns about the nature of Khadr's dangerousness and placed him in a maximum security facility. In October 2013, Khadr's prison transfer application, considered independently of Welner's involvement, was denied.  Over the objections of the Canadian government of Prime Minister Stephen Harper, a judge released Khadr to the community in 2015.

The Forensic Panel 

Welner is the founder and chairman of The Forensic Panel, a multi-specialty forensic practice which employs peer-review of its forensic consultation. The objective of peer review, pursuant to the protocols established by The Forensic Panel, is intended to minimize examiner bias by subjecting forensic assessment to the formal evaluation and scrutiny of peers, who critique the diligence, objectivity, and adherence to standards of the work. The Forensic Panel is composed of over thirty practitioner members who provide forensic consultation in psychiatry, psychology, neuroradiology, emergency and critical care medicine, nursing, toxicology, and pathology.

The Depravity Standard and other research

Depravity Standard/Depravity Scale 

Welner has pioneered research to operationalize an evidence-based approach for courts and juries charged with defining "heinous", "depraved", and "evil" crimes in sentencing determinations. The Depravity Standard contains twenty-five components of intent, actions, victimology, and attitudes associated with criminal offenses. The goal of the research is to promote an emphasis on gathering evidence as opposed to relying on impressionistic arguments, and to establish a methodology that prevents bias based on race, diagnosis, prognosis, or history, socioeconomics, or other personal factors. The application of the Depravity Standard distinguishes particular crimes by their severity relative to other comparable crimes. For example, the Depravity Standard's application will enable the distinction of the worst of murder relative to other murders, the worst of assault relative to other assaults, and the worst of white collar crimes and thefts relative to comparable crimes.

The Depravity Standard is an inventory of evidence relating to the different stages of a crime – before, during, and after. The Depravity Scale, an internet-based series of surveys and a component of the Depravity Standard research, has established public consensus for what aspects of a crime are most heinous. The Depravity Standard, informed in part by this data, by higher court decisions, and by evidence from adjudicated cases, is not a psychological evaluation or test. Rather, it is an inventory to guide inexperienced jurors on what qualities of a crime may distinguish its severity if they believe them to be present.

CIEEO (Clinical Inventory of the Everyday Extreme and Outrageous) 
The Depravity Standard research has inspired Dr. Welner's research into the CIEEO (Clinical Inventory of the Everyday Extreme and Outrageous), a 14-item inventory of non-criminal everyday evil reflecting a range of an actor's intent and effects on a victim. Unlike the Depravity Standard, the CIEEO is being developed to apply in clinical and screening settings to flag behaviors that warrant treatment or other intervention in order to prevent consequences at home, workplace, or community. The CIEEO is inspired by the goals of vigilance for child abuse – namely, detection and identification being the first step toward intervention and treatment of the worst of behaviors.

Perpetrators of drug-facilitated sex assault 

Welner researched and developed the typology for classifying drug-facilitated sex assaulters. Such offenders are distinguished by setting, be it workplace, in social interactions, or doctors. The offenders found in each of these separate settings exhibit particular qualities.

Public policy 
Welner was a key contributor a range of proposals within landmark mental health reform legislation that passed the United States Congress in 2016. He testified to lawmakers on multiple occasions prior to the bill's eventual passage.  Apart from advocating various ideas to expand crisis mental health services and to attract talent to treat the underserved, Welner also argued for the reform of commitment law, and reform of HIPAA, as a means to prevent both suicide and homicide outcomes. Welner was under serious consideration by the Trump Administration as Assistant Secretary of Mental Health in the Department of Health and Human Services, a position created to direct mental health and substance abuse policy in the United States.

Among his writings, Welner had long advocated for upgrading the integrity of forensic mental health through the videotaping of forensic psychiatry interviews, transparent exchange of notes, and peer review. His efforts to mandate videotaping of forensic mental health interviews resulted in laws passed in Illinois  and Colorado.

In 1992 and 1993, Welner was a media coordinator and spokesperson for the Ross Perot presidential election campaign in New York and the citizen action organization United We Stand America, also in New York.  During the 1992 election campaign, Welner debated in support of Perot against other candidates' representatives.

Media consultation, writings, and commentary 

Welner has been a contributor to numerous major network news programs. He was a forensic science consultant to ABC News' Law and Justice unit, and familiar to many viewers in particular of Good Morning America  and 20/20.  He has otherwise been a regular contributor to CNN, Fox News, Larry King Live, Bill Bennett's Morning in America, and the Dr. Oz Show, on issues relating to forensic psychiatry and forensic science.

Personal and professional background 
Born in Pittsburgh, Pennsylvania, Welner is the youngest of four children. Both his parents were born in Poland and lost their families in the Holocaust. His father Nick was civil engineer; his mother Barbara, who dropped out of school as a wartime refugee, entered nursing school in Britain unable to speak English and finished as valedictorian, going on to specialize in gerontology. Dr. Welner's oldest sister, Sandra Welner, M.D. was a Maryland-based gynecologist who fought through severe neurological disabilities suffered in a stroke became internationally renowned for her  medical research and advocacy for the medical care of the disabled.

Michael Welner graduated high school at the age of 15, then attended the University of Miami, where he earned a B.S. in biology, before moving on to the University of Miami School of Medicine.  While an undergraduate and medical student, he announced radio play-by-play for the University of Miami Hurricanes baseball and football teams—he would later credit game announcing as his best training for future success as a testifying expert witness.

He has maintained a clinical practice since 1992, specializing in patients who have difficulty responding to treatment, and has been Board Certified in Psychiatry, Forensic Psychiatry, Psychopharmacology and Disaster Medicine.  He is married to Orli Welner, a corporate attorney.

Selected bibliography 

 The Depravity Standard I: An Introduction" Welner M, O' Malley K, Gonidakis J, Tellalian R, Journal of Criminal Justice 55C March–April 2018 pp. 1–11  
 The Depravity Standard II: Developing a Measure of the Worst of Crimes" Welner M, O' Malley K, Gonidakis J, Saxena A, Burnes J Journal of Criminal Justice March–April 2018 55C (2018) pp. 25–34  
 The Depravity Standard III: Validating an Evidence-based Guide" Welner M, O' Malley K, Gonidakis J, Saxena A, Stewart J Journal of Criminal Justice March–April 2018 55C (2018) pp. 12–24  
 Peer-Reviewed Forensic Consultation: Safeguarding Expert Testimony and Protecting the Uninformed Court. Welner M., Mastellon T, Stewart J, Weinert B, Stratton J. Jl Forensic Psychology Practice. (in print) 
 Disaster Psychiatry. Welner M, Page J In: Disaster Preparedness for Health Care Facilities Canadian Centre of Excellence in Emergency Preparedness
 Mob Violence: A Forensic Psychiatric Perspective on Justice and Prevention. Welner M Empire State Prosecutor Fall 2011 pp 12–16
 Psychotropic Medications and Crime. Welner M., Lubit R, & Stewart J. In: Mozayani A, Raymon L (ed) Handbook of Drug Interactions: A Clinical and Forensic Guide. Humana London. 2011 pp 791–807  
 Antipsychotics Drugs and Interactions: Implications for Criminal and Civil Forensics. (book chapter) Welner, M. Opler L. In: Mozayani A, Raymon L (ed) Handbook of Drug Interactions: A Clinical and Forensic Guide.  Humana London. 2011 pp 229–259 
 Classifying Crimes by Severity: From Aggravators to Depravity, Welner M. In: Douglass J, Ressler R, Burgess A, FBI Crime Classification Manual. Jossey-Bass 2007 pp 55–72.
 Psychopathy, Media, and the Psychology at the Root of Terrorism Welner, M. In: Biological and Chemical Warfare Lawyers and Judges Publishing Tucson Az. 2004 pp 385–421.
 Motives in Crime. Welner, M. In: Dominick J et al. Crime Scene Investigation Elwin Street London. 2004 pp 126–135.
 The Perpetrators and Their Modus Operandi. Welner, M. In: LeBeau M, Mozayani A (ed) Drug Facilitated Sexual Assault. Academic Press. London. 2001 pp 39–74.

References

External links 

 The Forensic Panel
 TruTV Crime Library Profile of Dr. Michael Welner

1964 births
American non-fiction crime writers
American forensic psychiatrists
American psychology writers
American male non-fiction writers
Duquesne University faculty
Living people
Medical educators
New York University faculty
Writers from Pittsburgh
Leonard M. Miller School of Medicine alumni